The Sporting News College Football Player of the Year award is given to the player of the year in college football as adjudged by Sporting News.

Winners
Oklahoma and Ohio State hold the record for most awards, with each school having won nine times.

References

College football national player awards
Awards established in 1942
1942 establishments in the United States